Thurning could be

 Thurning, Norfolk
 Thurning, Northamptonshire